The 2018 IMSA Michelin SportsCar Encore was the inaugural edition of the non-championship sports car race held at Sebring International Raceway on 9 November 2018. The race was contested with LMP3 cars, GT3-spec cars, GT4-spec cars and TCR-touring car. The event was organized by the International Motor Sports Association (IMSA).

The race was won by Roman De Angelis and Kyle Kirkwood, driving a Ligier JS P3 entered by ANSA Motorsports. Kirkwood and teammate Dakota Dickerson signed up at the last minute, given the opportunity by Onroak Automotive North America as a reward for respectively winning the F3 Americas Championship and Formula 4 United States Championship. The event marked Kirkwood's sports car debut.

Report
The race was held as a standalone event, open to Pro-Am teams and drivers regardless of whether they had participated in any IMSA sanctioned events in 2018. Continental would not be providing tyres for the 2019 IMSA SportsCar Championship, leaving Michelin as the sole supplier going forward. For this event, Michelin tyres were mandated to give teams the opportunity to sample them.

Pole position went to the #26 K2R Ligier, qualified by Kay van Berlo in his first race in the United States, from the #13 ANSA Ligier of Roman De Angelis. Van Berlo pulled away from De Angelis in the early phase of the race. The first round of pit stops started on lap 24. Van Berlo extended his stint, but the caution came out on lap 28 when Dean Baker touched the kerb with the underbody of his #4 ANSA Ligier. The cars that had stayed out were forced to pit under yellow and lined up at the tail end of the field. To add insult to injury, the #26 car was caught speeding on pit road and its second driver James McGuire was forced to take a drive-through penalty.

The #2 ANSA Ligier retired with engine issues on lap 51, leading to the race's third caution period. The #13 car had only just pitted and De Angelis inherited the lead as the other cars pitted under yellow. Lance Willsey lost control of his #33 ESM Ligier while warming his tyres and stalled his car on the grass, which brought his race to an end.

The #19 Performance Tech Ligier stopped at the end of pit lane on lap 60. The #25 P1 Ligier suffered a heavy crash on lap 87 when Kenton Koch lost the rear on entry to Turn 3. Koch escaped unharmed. All cars had already made their final pit stop, so the ensuing caution served to compress the field ahead of a 26-minute sprint finish.

At the final restart, the #13 car of De Angelis led from the #26 of Matthew Bell. Bell kept within two seconds of De Angelis but was unable to make an overtake, and the victory went to De Angelis and Kyle Kirkwood. The #11 car of Nico Rondet and the #40 car of Katherine Legge battled hard for the final step on the podium until, with four minutes to go, Rondet hit the back of Legge's car at Turn 15 and span.

The only non-Ligier LMP3 car in the field was the ADESS-03, the car making its racing debut at the event in the hands of the Atlantic Racing Team. Mechanical issues forced it into the pits after roughly 30 minutes of racing. After an extended repair period, the team were able to get the car out on track again just before the halfway point of the race. They used the remainder of the event as a test session and reached the finish albeit 33 laps down.

The GT4 class was controlled by the #60 and #59 KohR Ford Mustangs, the two cars holding first and second from the #22 GMG Audi R8. The Audi managed to take second place by the end of the race, but victory went to the #60 Ford of Nate Stacy, Kyle Marcelli and Dean Martin.

The TCR class became a battle between the two Audi RS3s after the #31 Rumcastle Volkswagen Golf lost two laps in the pits with a rear wing replacement. The #82 Mark Motors Audi led the class for most of the race but the #54 JDC-Miller Audi was ahead at the final restart. The #82 retook the lead with a lap and a half remaining, but the #54 car ran out of fuel anyway on the final lap. In the end, the all-Canadian entry driven by Marco Cirone and Remo Ruscitti were able to cruise to victory.

The Encore proved popular, and was renewed for a second edition in 2019.

Classes
 Le Mans Prototype 3 (LMP3) 
 Grand Sport (GS) (run to GT4 regulations)
 Touring Car (TCR) (run to TCR regulations)

Entry List

LMP3

Grand Sport

Touring Car

Race results
Class winners denoted in bold and with

References

International Motor Sports Association
Sebring, Florida
IMSA Michelin Encore
IMSA Michelin Encore
IMSA Michelin Encore